The Mid-Atlantic District is one of 17 districts of the Barbershop Harmony Society (formerly known as SPEBSQSA or the Society for the Preservation and Encouragement of Barbershop Quartet Singing in America).  The district, with three regional divisions, has approximately 90 chapters in the following states: VA, MD, PA, NJ, DE, DC, WV, NY.

Notable choruses

Delaware

 First State Harmonizers; Milford, DE

Maryland
 Chorus of the Chesapeake – Dundalk, MD (2-time International Champions – 1961, 1971)
 Harmony Express Men's Chorus – Germantown, MD
 Pride of DelMarVa – Queen Anne's County, MD 
 Sons of the Severn – Annapolis, MD

New Jersey
 Brothers in Harmony – Hamilton Square, NJ (2013 6th place International Finalists)
 East Coast Sound – West Caldwell, NJ
 The Pine Barons Chorus – Cherry Hill, NJ (1981 5th place International, Detroit)

New York
 Big Apple Chorus – Manhattan, NY, NY
 Voices of Gotham – Hell's Kitchen, NY (2012 District Champions)
 Westchester Chordsmen – White Plains, NY

Pennsylvania
 Bryn Mawr Mainliners – Bryn Mawr, PA (2-time District Champions 1991 and 1997)
 Keystone Capital Chorus – Harrisburg, PA
 Parkside Harmony – Hershey, PA
 Red Rose Chorus – Lancaster, PA
 The North Pennsmen – Lansdale, PA
 The Bucks County Country Gentlemen – Bucks County, PA
 White Rose Chorus – York, PA

Virginia
 Alexandria Harmonizers – Alexandria, VA (4-time International Champions – 1986, 1989, 1995, 1998)
 Virginians – Richmond, VA
 Harrisonburg Harmonizers – Harrisonburg, VA
 The Commodore Chorus; Norfolk, VA

Washington, D.C.
 Singing Capital Chorus – Washington, D.C.

West Virginia
no current chapters in this district

Notable quartets
Oriole Four

See also
 Barbershop Harmony Society
 Barbershop music
 Barbershop Arrangements
 A cappella music
 American Harmony Documentary Film about Barbershop music

References

External links
 Mid-Atlantic District official website

Barbershop Harmony Society
American choirs